The South Sudanese Ambassador in Washington, D. C. is the official representative of the Government in Juba to the Government of the United States.

List of representatives

References

Ambassadors of South Sudan to the United States
United States
Sudan, South